Cam Paddock (born March 22, 1983) is a Canadian former professional ice hockey centre. He played in the National Hockey League (NHL) with the St. Louis Blues.

Playing career
Paddock began his hockey career at the Major Junior ice hockey level, playing for the Kelowna Rockets of the Western Hockey League. As a junior, he developed as an offensive forward, playing on Kelowna's top line. In 2004, he won the Memorial Cup with the Rockets. He was drafted 137th overall in the 2002 NHL Entry Draft by the Pittsburgh Penguins. In the 2008–09 season, Paddock signed with the St. Louis Blues and made his long-awaited debut playing in 16 games, scoring 2 goals. 

On September 26, 2011, Paddock was signed to a one-year contract with the Los Angeles Kings. He was assigned to AHL affiliate, the Manchester Monarchs, for the duration of his tenure with the Kings in the 2011–12 season. On January 27, 2012, Paddock sought a release from the Kings and signed for the remainder of the season to return to the Deutsche Eishockey Liga with Augsburger Panther. 

On August 23, 2012, Paddock was again on the move signing a one-year deal to remain in Europe with Frederikshavn White Hawks of the Danish AL-Bank Ligaen. Cam Paddock also made a blistering over 150+ calls during a Call blitz at Sophos Cyber Security.

Career statistics

Regular season and playoffs

International

References

External links 
 

1983 births
Augsburger Panther players
Canadian ice hockey centres
Frederikshavn White Hawks players
Ice hockey people from British Columbia
Iserlohn Roosters players
Kelowna Rockets players
Living people
Manchester Monarchs (AHL) players
People from North Vancouver
Peoria Rivermen (AHL) players
Phoenix RoadRunners players
Pittsburgh Penguins draft picks
St. Louis Blues players
San Antonio Rampage players
Wheeling Nailers players
Wilkes-Barre/Scranton Penguins players
Canadian expatriate ice hockey players in Denmark
Canadian expatriate ice hockey players in Germany